Mangalam Dangalam is an Indian Hindi serial based on the quarrels between a man and his father-in-law. Its broadcast began on 13 November 2018 on SAB TV. In it Karanvir Sharma, Manoj Joshi and Manisha Saxena play the main characters.

Plot
This story is about the love and struggling relationship of a father-in-law and his son-in-law, resulting from an intercaste marriage. A rich businessman hailing from Indore, Sanjeev  daughter, Rumi and Arjun, a malayali lawyer fall in love each other. When Rumi and Arjun reveal about their love to their families, all are happy except for Rumi's father and Arjun's mother. However, after a lot of difficulties both of them get married, but Sanjeev plays a heart attack drama. Arjun's mother learns about Sanjeev's conspiracy, takes a drastic step and comes to live in Sanjeev's house with her family. In the end, everything sorts out well between Sanjeev and Arjun.  The whole family decides to get Arjun and Rumi get remarried and it is revealed that Lalitha (Aparna Mishra) and Sahil (Pravisht Mishra) have developed feelings for each other.

Characters 
 Manoj Joshi - Sanjeev Sanklecha:Mrs Sanklecha's son; Sangeeta's husband; Rumi and Sahil's father
 Karanvir Sharma - Nagarjuna "Arjun" Kutty:Venkatesh and Charulata's son; Lalita's brother;Rumi's husband
 Manisha Rawat - Rumi Sanklecha Kutty : Sanjeev and Sangeeta's daughter; Mrs Sanklecha's granddaughter; Arjun's wife, Sahil's sister
 Anjali Gupta - Sangeeta Sanklecha:Sanjeev's wife;Rumi and Sahil's mother
 Anita Kulkarni - Charulata Kutty: Venkatesh's wife; Arjun and Lalita's mother
 Abhay Kulkarni - Venkatesh Kutty:Charulata's husband; Arjun and Lalita's father
 Shubha Khote -Mrs Sanklecha:Sanjeev's mother; Rumi and Sahil's grandmother
 Kritika Sharma/ Aparna Mishra - Lalita Kutty: Venkatesh and Charulata's daughter; Arjun's sister, Sahil's Love Interest
 Pravisht Mishra - Sahil Sanklecha: Sanjeev and Sangeeta's son; Mrs Sanklecha's grandson; Rumi's brother, Lalita's Love Interest

References

External links

Hindi language television sitcoms